Jennifer Finney Boylan (born June 22, 1958) is a bestselling author, transgender activist, professor at Barnard College, and a contributing opinion writer for the New York Times.

Early life and education
Boylan was born in Valley Forge, Pennsylvania, and graduated from The Haverford School, a private prep school in Haverford, Pennsylvania, in 1976. She graduated from Wesleyan University in 1980, then completed graduate work in English at Johns Hopkins University.

Career
Boylan was on the faculty of Colby College from 1988 to 2014. In 2000, she was named "Professor of the Year" at Colby College. She moved to Barnard in 2014, where she is both Professor of English and Anna Quindlen Writer-in-Residence.

Boylan has written thirteen books, including novels, collections of short stories, and her memoir. Her 2003 memoir, She's Not There: A Life in Two Genders was the first book published by an openly transgender American to become a bestseller and was described by The Advocate as "a seminal piece of the trans literary canon". Her memoir, Good Boy: My Life in Seven Dogs was published on April 21, 2020 with Celadon Books.

In October 2022, she published Mad Honey, a novel co-written with New York Times bestselling author, Jodi Picoult.

She was a Contributing Opinion Writer in The New York Times from October 2007 to April 2022.

In 2013, Boylan was chosen as the first openly transgender co-chair of GLAAD's National Board of Directors. Boylan also serves on the Policy Advisory Board of Gender Rights Maryland and the Board of Trustees of the Kinsey Institute for Research on Sex, Gender, and Reproduction.

Public life 
Boylan has spoken on numerous college campuses, including Harvard, Yale, Cornell, Columbia, and Barnard. Boylan has made appearances via a variety of media outlets to discuss her life, books, and activism. She has appeared on The Oprah Winfrey Show, Larry King Live, The Today Show, 48 Hours, and NPR. She made an appearance on 20/20 on April 24, 2015 after Caitlyn Jenner came out as trans, and regularly appeared on screen and as a consultant on Jenner's reality show I Am Cait.

Based on the text of the appeal, she signed "A Letter on Justice and Open Debate" which appeared on Harper's Magazine website on 7 July 2020, including many high-profile names, some with controversial positions on human sexuality within the trans community, such as J. K. Rowling. On discovering the names of the other signatories post-publication, Boylan retracted her signature.

On NPR's news quiz program "Wait, Wait, Don't Tell Me!", Boylan achieved a perfect score when tested about hot dogs.

Personal life 
Boylan is a trans woman. She has two children, Zaira and Sean, with Deirdre Boylan, whom she married in 1988. Boylan began transitioning in 2000. In 2019, she told the LGBTQ&A podcast, "I've been maybe three or four different women at this point in my life. Early on in transition, I was very youthful. I cared a lot about my appearance and being sexy and my clothes. Fashion was really important to me, passing was really important to me. Appearing cis, I'm sorry to say, was probably more important to me than it should have been...It's the spectacular mystery of life, the way we keep becoming other versions of ourselves."

She lives with her wife in New York City and Belgrade Lakes, Maine. Nine years after she began her transition, Boylan published an article for The New York Times stating that "my spouse and I love each other, and that our legal union has been a good thing – for us, for our children and our community".

Boylan plays keyboard instruments as well as the zither and describes playing in various bands in her autobiography.

Awards and honors 
In June 2020, in honor of the 50th anniversary of the first LGBTQ Pride parade, Queerty named her among the fifty heroes “leading the nation toward equality, acceptance, and dignity for all people”.

Bibliography 
Remind Me to Murder You Later (1988) 
The Planets (April 15, 1991) 
The Constellations: A Novel (November 8, 1994) 
Getting In (September 1, 1998) 
She's Not There: A Life in Two Genders (July 29, 2003) 
I'm Looking Through You: Growing Up Haunted: A Memoir (January 15, 2008) 
Falcon Quinn and the Black Mirror (May 11, 2010) 
Falcon Quinn and the Crimson Vapor (May 10, 2011) 
Stuck in the Middle with You: A Memoir of Parenting in Three Genders (April 30, 2013) 
Trans Bodies, Trans Selves: A Resource for the Transgender Community (June 10, 2014) 
You Are You (May 12, 2015) 
Falcon Quinn and the Bullies of Greenblud (September 16, 2016)
Long Black Veil (April 11, 2017) 
Good Boy: My Life in Seven Dogs (April 21, 2020) 
Mad Honey with Jodi Picoult (2022)

Anthologies
Sexual Metamorphosis: An Anthology of Transsexual Memoirs (April 12, 2005) 
The Book of Dads: Essays on the Joys, Perils, and Humiliations of Fatherhood (May 12, 2009) 
Love Is a Four-Letter Word: True Stories of Breakups, Bad Relationships, and Broken Hearts (July 28, 2009) 
How Beautiful the Ordinary (October 6, 2009) 
It Gets Better (March 22, 2011) 
Truth & Dare: 20 Tales of Heartbreak and Happiness (April 26, 2011)

See also
 LGBT culture in New York City
 List of LGBT people from New York City

References

External links

 
 Barnard College faculty profile
 Jennifer Finney Boylan Papers, 1961-2004 MC 1025; T-550. Schlesinger Library, Radcliffe Institute, Harvard University, Cambridge, Mass.

1958 births
American autobiographers
American memoirists
American women academics
American women memoirists
Barnard College faculty
Colby College faculty
Haverford School alumni
Johns Hopkins University alumni
Transgender memoirists
LGBT people from Maine
LGBT people from Pennsylvania
Lambda Literary Award winners
Living people
Participants in American reality television series
People from Belgrade, Maine
People from Chester County, Pennsylvania
Transgender academics
LGBT media personalities
Transgender women
Transgender rights activists
Transgender studies academics
Wesleyan University alumni
Writers from Maine